Charles Barclay may refer to:

 Charles Barclay (MP) (1780–1855), British brewer, politician and landowner
 Charles Barclay (cricketer) (1837–1910), English cricketer
 Charles James Barclay (admiral) (1843–?)
 Charles James Barclay (banker) (1841–1904), Australian banker
 Charles Frederick Barclay (1844–1914), Republican U.S. Representative from the state of Pennsylvania
 Charles Theodore Barclay (1867–1921), English rower
 Charles Barclay, the male lead character in the 1942 film The Gay Sisters, played by George Brent

See also
 Charles Barkley (disambiguation)